{| style="margin:5px; border:1px solid #8888AA;" align=right cellpadding=3 cellspacing=3 width=280
|- align="center" bgcolor="#dddddd"
|colspan=2| Saint-Hyacinthe Top Design''"
|- align="center"
|colspan=2| 
|- align="center"
|colspan=2|
|- align="center" bgcolor="#eeeeee"
|| Founded || 1996
|- align="center"
|| Home ice || Stade L.P. Gaucher
|- align="center" bgcolor="#eeeeee"
|| Based in || Saint-Hyacinthe, Quebec
|- align="center"
|| Colours || Grey, Gold and White
|- align="center" bgcolor="#eeeeee"
|| League || Ligue Nord-Américaine de Hockey
|}
The Saint-Hyacinthe Chiefs was a semi-pro ice hockey team based in Saint-Hyacinthe, Quebec, which is now defunct. The team was part of the Ligue Nord-Américaine de Hockey (LNAH). The Chiefs played at the Stade L.P. Gaucher.

The team started in Acton Vale, Quebec as the Acton Vale Nova in 1996 and later became the Acton Vale Beaulieu. They moved to Saint-Hyacinthe in 2001-2002 and were named the Saint-Hyacinthe Cousin'''. The team was renamed the Saint-Hyacinthe Cristal in 2005-2006, before becoming the Saint-Hyacinthe Top Design.

In 2008, the team was once again renamed, becoming the Saint-Hyacinthe Chiefs. The team eventually folded permanently after the 2008–2009 season.

References

Ice hockey teams in Quebec
Sport in Saint-Hyacinthe
Defunct Ligue Nord-Américaine de Hockey teams
Quebec Semi-Pro Hockey League teams